The 2018 Premier Volleyball League Reinforced Conference was the fourth conference of the Premier Volleyball League (31st conference of the former Shakey's V-League). Conference will start on April 27, 2018 with a Grand Fans Day at the Trinoma Activity Center, Quezon City, 9 days before its opening ceremonies and games on May 6, 2018 at the Filoil Flying V Centre, San Juan City, Philippines.
PLDT returns as PayMaya after two years of absence in the league and newcomer teams, Tacloban Fighting Warays and Petro Gazz Angels are expected to join the league.
Teams will play a single round robin in the preliminary round. The top two teams (ranks 1 and 2) after the preliminary round will automatically enter the semifinals round. The bottom teams after the preliminary round will play a single round robin to determine the two teams (as ranks 3 and 4) that will advance to the semifinals round.

Women's division

Participating teams

Foreign players

Preliminary round 
 Team standings

|}

 Match results
All times are in Philippines Standard Time (UTC+08:00)

|}

Quarterfinals round 
 Team standings

|}

 Match results
All times are in Philippines Standard Time (UTC+08:00)

|}

Final round 

 All series are best-of-three.

Semifinals 
Rank 1 vs Rank 4

|}
Rank 2 vs Rank 3

|}

Finals 
3rd place

|}
Championship

|}

Awards

Final standings

Medal team rosters

Men's division

Participating teams

Preliminary round 
Team standings

|}

 Match results
All times are in Philippines Standard Time (UTC+08:00)

|}

Quarterfinals round 
Team standings

|}

Match results

|}

Final round 

 All series are best-of-three.

Semifinals 
Rank 1 vs Rank 4

|}
Rank 2 vs Rank 3

|}

Finals 
3rd Place

|}
Championship

|}

Awards

Final standings

Medal team rosters

References 

2018
2018 in Philippine sport